Carlos Santos Rubio (born 1977) is a Spanish actor. He appeared in more than thirty films since 2001.

Selected filmography

References

External links 

1978 births
Living people
Spanish male film actors
21st-century Spanish male actors
Actors from the Region of Murcia
Spanish male television actors